Steve Jolliffe (born 28 April 1949) is an English musician.

After meeting Rick Davies (Supertramp) in the late 1960s Jolliffe played with him in a band called the Joint. He left the Joint to study music at the Berlin Konservatorium. There he met Edgar Froese and played with one of the earliest incarnations of Tangerine Dream. He subsequently joined the band Steamhammer, a blues-rock outfit that experienced moderate success in the early 1970s, touring extensively and played on their "Steamhammer II" album, as well as co-writing the "Autumn Song" single which topped the French charts. After leaving the band, Jolliffe composed the music for John Samson's 1973 documentary Tattoo.

Jolliffe rejoined Tangerine Dream in the late 1970s, recording the album Cyclone with the band in 1978. He then released a solo album entitled Earth in 1978. After this Jolliffe released solo albums at the rate of approximately one per year, including The Bruton Suite, Journeys Out Of The Body, Alien and Zanzi.

Jolliffe is a multi-instrumentalist, playing, among others, the keyboard, flute and piccolo.

References

External links
 Official website

1949 births
Living people
Steamhammer (band) members
Tangerine Dream members